Science Realm is a United States Government project with the aim of creating a vertical-takeoff horizontal-landing (VTOHL) single-stage-to-orbit (SSTO) craft, the term is also associated with the software this project uses to simulate takeoff and landing.

Science Dawn
Science Realm's predecessor Science Dawn was a classified program to build a rocket-launched supersonic  horizontal-take off horizontal-landing (HOTOL) SSTO spaceplane. However, it became clear that horizontal takeoff requirement was an inappropriate application of rocket thrust-to-weight ratio; the angle and relative size of rocket and earth meant the path of least effort was almost completely vertical (completely against gravitation). Consequently, SCIENCE DAWN ended, and the focus transferred to SCIENCE REALM.

Spaceplane
The Space Maneuver Vehicle (SMV) completed a successful autonomous approach and landing on its first flight test on 11 August 1998. The unmanned vehicle was dropped from a US Army UH-60 Black Hawk helicopter at an altitude of 9,000 feet, performed a controlled approach and landed on the runway. The total flight time was 90 seconds. During the initial portion of its free fall, the maneuver vehicle was stabilized by a parachute. After it is released from the parachute, the vehicle accelerated and perform a controlled glide. This glide simulated the final approach and landing phases of such a vehicle returning from orbit.

Performance requirements
The project is split into four Maximum Performance Missions Sets, which attempt to define the maximum conditions for four general uses of the spaceplane. Due to the high secrecy of the project, instead of giving a threshold and objective for each mission requirement, missions sets are defined.

Mark I
Demonstrator or ACTD non-orbital vehicle that can only pop up
 Pop-up profile:  Approximately Mach 16 at 300 kft at payload separation
 Pop up and deliver 1 to 3 klbs of mission assets (does not include boost stage, aeroshell, guidance or propellant) to any terrestrial destination
 Pop up and deliver 3 to 5 klbs of orbital assets (does not include upperstage) due east to a 100 x 100 NM orbit
 Payload bay size 10' x 5' x 5', weight capacity 10 klbs

Mark II
Mark 2 defines an orbit capable vehicle with these requirements
 Pop up and deliver 7 to 9 klbs of mission assets (does not include boost stage, aeroshell, guidance or propellant) to any terrestrial destination
 Pop up and deliver 15 klbs of orbital assets (does not include upperstage) due east to a 100 x 100 NM orbit
 Launch due east, carrying 4-klb payload, orbit at 100 x 100 NM
 Payload bay size 25' x 12' x 12', weight capacity 20 klbs

Mark III
 Pop up and deliver 14 to 18 klbs of mission assets (does not include boost stage, aeroshell, guidance or propellant) to any terrestrial destination
 Pop up and deliver 25 klbs of orbital assets (does not include upperstage) due east to a 100 x 100 NM orbit
 Launch due east, carrying a 6-klb payload, orbit at 100 x 100 NM and return to base
 Launch polar, carrying 1-klb payload and return to base
 Payload bay size 25' x 12' x 12', weight capacity 40 klbs

Mark IV
 Pop up and deliver 20 to 30 klbs of mission assets (does not include boost stage, aeroshell, guidance or propellant) to any terrestrial destination
 Pop up and deliver 45 klbs of orbital assets (does not include upperstage) due east to a 100 x 100 NM orbit
 Launch due east, carrying a 20-klb payload, orbit at 100 x 100 NM and return to base
 Launch polar, carrying 5-klb payload and return to base
 Payload bay size 45' x 15' x 15', weight capacity 60 klbs

See also

Spacecraft and spaceplane propulsion
 Aerospike engine
 Space transport
 Scramjet

Not SSTO
 Two-stage-to-orbit
 Three-stage-to-orbit

Other spaceplane and spacecraft vehicles
 Avatar RLV
 NASA Space Shuttle decision
 HOTOL
 Reaction Engines Skylon
 VentureStar
 X-30
 X-33

References

External links
 GLOBSEC
 stealth aircraft projects
 Federation of American Scientists

Single-stage-to-orbit